Brigadier General Frederick William Henry Walshe  (1872–1931) was a senior British Army officer during the First World War.

Biography

Born on 26 July 1872, Frederick Walshe was educated at Bedford School and at Royal Military Academy, Woolwich. He received his first commission as a second lieutenant in the Royal Artillery in 1892, was promoted to the rank of lieutenant in the Royal Horse Artillery in 1897, to the rank of captain in 1899, and to the rank of major in 1909. He served during the First World War, between 1914 and 1918, during the Gallipoli Campaign, in Egypt and in France. He was promoted to the rank of brigadier general in 1919, serving with Lieutenant General Anton Deniken and General Pyotr Nikolayevich Wrangel during the Russian Civil War, between 1919 and 1920. He was Aide-de-camp to King George V, between 1920 and 1928, served in Turkey and Mesopotamia, in 1921, and in India, between 1924 and 1928.

Brigadier General Frederick Walshe was invested as a Companion of the Distinguished Service Order in 1917, as a Companion of the Order of St Michael and St George in 1919, and as a Companion of the Order of the Bath in 1928. He retired from the British Army in 1928 and died in Weymouth, Dorset, on 15 January 1931, aged 58.

References

1872 births
1931 deaths
People educated at Bedford School
Graduates of the Royal Military Academy, Woolwich
British Army personnel of World War I
British Army personnel of the Russian Civil War
Companions of the Order of the Bath
Companions of the Order of St Michael and St George
Companions of the Distinguished Service Order
British Army generals
Royal Artillery officers